Jennifer Podemski (born May 3, 1973) is a First Nations (Canadian) film and television actress and producer.

Her acting credits include starring roles in the television series Tin Star, The Rez, Riverdale, Moccasin Flats, Bliss, and Moose TV, and the films Dance Me Outside, The Diviners, and Empire of Dirt, as well as supporting or guest roles in Degrassi, Republic of Doyle, The Eleventh Hour, Blue Murder, Wild Card, This Is Wonderland, Rabbit Fall, The Border, and Maniac Mansion. Her production credits include Rabbit Fall, Moccasin Flats, and Empire of Dirt.

Early life 
Podemski was born and raised in Toronto, Ontario. Her father is Jewish and her mother is of Saulteaux/Ojibwe/Anishinaabe, Leni Lenape, and Métis descent. Her paternal grandparents were from Poland, and moved to Canada after WWII. Her sisters, Tamara Podemski and Sarah Podemski are also actors. All three sisters appear together in the FX series Reservation Dogs.

Career 
Podemski was a Gemini Award nominee for the Best Actress in a Drama Series at the 1997 Gemini Awards for The Rez and a Canadian Screen Award nominee for Best Supporting Actress at the 2nd Canadian Screen Awards, for Empire of Dirt.

In 2018, Podemski created the documentary series Future History for APTN. In 2021, together with Derek Diorio, she created the television series Unsettled for APTN. She went on to produce the drama series Little Bird for Crave with Hanna Moscovitch.

In January 2023, she was named as a recipient of the Academy of Canadian Cinema and Television's Board of Directors Tribute Award at the 11th Canadian Screen Awards.

Filmography

Film

References

External links
 

1974 births
Living people
Canadian people of Polish-Jewish descent
Canadian film actresses
Film producers from Ontario
Canadian television actresses
Canadian television producers
Native American actors
Canadian women television producers
First Nations actresses
Jewish Canadian actresses
Canadian Métis people
Actresses from Toronto
Native American actresses
20th-century Canadian actresses
21st-century Canadian actresses
20th-century First Nations people
21st-century First Nations people
Canadian women film producers
Canadian Film Centre alumni
Saulteaux people
Canadian television directors
Canadian women television directors